Boavista dos Pinheiros is a parish in Portugal, located in the municipality of Odemira. The population in 2011 was 1,633, in an area of 37.85 km2. The main economic activities are agriculture and forestry.

References

Freguesias of Odemira